Trap Cake, Vol. 2 is the second EP by Puerto Rican singer Rauw Alejandro. It was released on February 25, 2022, as the follow-up to his debut EP released in 2019, Trap Cake, Vol. 1. It features guest appearances from Shenseea, Future, Rvssian, Ty Dolla Sign and Ankhal. The EP's lead single, "Caprichoso", was released two weeks prior to the EP's release on February 7, 2022.

Commercial performance 
Trap Cake, Vol. 2 debuted at number 6 on both the US Billboard Top Latin Albums and Latin Rhythm Albums charts with 7,000 album-equivalent units.

Track listing

Charts

References 

2022 EPs
Rauw Alejandro EPs